Agustin Cartagena Diaz was born in Puerto Rico and a Lieutenant colonel with the Puerto Rico Police who became the 17 Superintendent of the police of Puerto Rico elected in the first year of the administration of Governor Sila María Calderón from 2003-2005.

External links
Acogida unánime a Cartagena Díaz, 2004

Living people
Place of birth missing (living people)
Year of birth missing (living people)
Puerto Rican law enforcement personnel
Puerto Rican police officers
Superintendents of the Puerto Rico Police